This is a list of municipalities in Iran which have standing links to local communities in other countries known as "town twinning" (usually in Europe) or "sister cities" (usually in the rest of the world).

A
Abadan
 Taormina, Italy

D
Delijan
 Dilijan, Armenia

G
Gorgan

 Aktau, Kazakhstan
 Samsun, Turkey

H
Hamadan

 Bukhara, Uzbekistan
 Isparta, Turkey
 Kulob, Tajikistan

I
Isfahan

 Baalbek, Lebanon

 Dakar, Senegal
 Florence, Italy
 Freiburg im Breisgau, Germany
 Havana, Cuba
 Iași, Romania
 Kuala Lumpur, Malaysia
 Kuwait City, Kuwait
 Lahore, Pakistan
 Saint Petersburg, Russia
 Xi'an, China
 Yerevan, Armenia

K
Kermanshah
 Gaziantep, Turkey

Kish Island
 Langkawi, Malaysia

Kazerun
 Al-Mada'in, Iraq

M
Maragheh
 Goražde, Bosnia and Herzegovina

Mashhad

 Karachi, Pakistan
 Karbala, Iraq
 Kuala Lumpur, Malaysia
 Lahore, Pakistan
 Mazar-i-Sharif, Afghanistan
 Najaf, Iraq
 Santiago de Compostela, Spain
 Ürümqi, China

N
Nishapur

 Baghdad, Iraq
 Balkh, Afghanistan
 Basra, Iraq
 Bukhara, Uzbekistan
 Ghazni, Afghanistan
 Herat, Afghanistan
 Kairouan, Tunisia
 Karbala, Iraq
 Khiva, Uzbekistan
 Khoy, Iran
 Khujand, Tajikistan
 Konya, Turkey
 Kulob, Tajikistan
 Merv, Turkmenistan
 Samarkand, Uzbekistan

Q
Qazvin
 Bishkek, Kyrgyzstan

Qom

 Baalbek, Lebanon
 Karachi, Pakistan
 Karbala, Iraq
 Konya, Turkey
 Linxiang, China
 Santiago de Compostela, Spain

R
Rasht

 Astrakhan, Russia
 Moscow, Russia
 Multan, Pakistan

 Trabzon, Turkey

S
Sari
 Astrakhan, Russia

Shiraz

 Chongqing, China
 Dushanbe, Tajikistan
 Nanjing, China
 Nicosia, Cyprus
 Pécs, Hungary

T
Tabriz

 Baku, Azerbaijan
 Erzurum, Turkey
 Ganja, Azerbaijan
 Gaza City, Palestine
 Istanbul, Turkey
 Karbala, Iraq
 Kazan, Russia
 Khujand, Tajikistan
 Mogilev, Belarus
 Shanghai, China

Tehran

 Ankara, Turkey
 Baghdad, Iraq
 Beijing, China
 Bishkek, Kyrgyzstan
 Brasília, Brazil
 Budapest, Hungary
 Caracas, Venezuela
 Dushanbe, Tajikistan
 East Jerusalem, Palestine
 Havana, Cuba
 Kabul, Afghanistan
 Khartoum, Sudan
 London, England, United Kingdom
 Los Angeles, United States
 Manila, Philippines
 Minsk, Belarus
 Moscow, Russia
 Pretoria, South Africa
 Sanaa, Yemen
 Sarajevo, Bosnia and Herzegovina
 Tbilisi, Georgia

U
Urmia

 Erzurum, Turkey
 Fujian, China
 Varna, Bulgaria

Y
Yazd

 Homs, Syria
 Jászberény, Hungary
 Poti, Georgia

Z
Zanjan
 Trabzon, Turkey

References

Iran
Twin towns and sister cities
Cities in Iran
Foreign relations of Iran